The 2022 CS Nebelhorn Trophy was held on September 21–24, 2022 in Oberstdorf, Germany. It was part of the 2022–23 ISU Challenger Series. Medals were awarded in the disciplines of men's singles, women's singles, pairs, and ice dance.

Entries 
The International Skating Union published the list of entries on August 29, 2022.

Changes to preliminary assignments

Results

Men

Women

Pairs

Ice dance

References 

2022 in figure skating
CS Nebelhorn
Sports competitions in Oberstdorf